The Premio Herralde is a Spanish literary prize. It is awarded annually by the publishing house Anagrama to an original novel in the Spanish language. Established in 1983, the prize takes its name from Jorge Herralde, founder of Anagrama. Accompanied by a cash prize, the award is announced every year in November.

List of winners

List of finalists

References

External links
 Editorial Anagrama
 Premio Herralde

Spanish literary awards